David Bartlett (October 23, 1855 – October 16, 1913) was an American lawyer and politician in the state of North Dakota. He served as Lieutenant Governor of North Dakota from 1901 to 1907 under Governors Frank White and Elmore Y. Sarles.

Bartlett was born in Lemorna, Maine in 1855. He graduated from the University of Michigan in 1876, attaining a law degree. Bartlett resided briefly in Colorado before moving to Cooperstown, North Dakota in 1883, becoming a pioneering businessman and citizen of Griggs County, North Dakota. He served on the North Dakota Constitutional Convention of 1889. Bartlett also served as states attorney of Griggs County, and was a proponent of prohibition. He served as the Republican lieutenant governor of North Dakota from 1901 to 1907, but later joined the Progressive Movement in 1912. He died on October 16, 1913 in Boston from a cerebral hemorrhage.

References

1855 births
1913 deaths
Lieutenant Governors of North Dakota
University of Michigan Law School alumni
19th-century American politicians
20th-century American politicians